Building 29 is a historic aircraft hangar at 162 North Beacon Road, on the western edge of Walnut Ridge Regional Airport in Lawrence County, Arkansas.  It is a large metal-framed structure, built in 1942 using the standard DH-1 Army plan for such buildings.  It was part of the national home defense efforts of World War II.  It is one of a small number of such buildings left in the state, and the only one surviving virtually unaltered of four built at Walnut Ridge, which was used as a military airfield 1941–46.  The rear of the building (which faces the street) has had a small brick office cell attached.

The building was listed on the National Register of Historic Places in 2012.

See also
National Register of Historic Places listings in Lawrence County, Arkansas

References

Aircraft hangars in the United States
Buildings and structures in Lawrence County, Arkansas
Buildings and structures completed in 1942
Closed installations of the United States Army
1942 establishments in Arkansas
Aircraft hangars on the National Register of Historic Places
Transportation buildings and structures on the National Register of Historic Places in Arkansas